The 1927 New York Yankees season was the 25th season of the New York Yankees of the American League. The team finished with a record of 110–44–1, winning their fifth pennant and finishing 19 games ahead of the Philadelphia Athletics and were tied for first or better for the whole season. New York was managed by Miller Huggins. The Yankees played at Yankee Stadium. In the 1927 World Series, they won, sweeping the Pittsburgh Pirates. This Yankees team was known for its feared lineup, which was nicknamed "Murderers' Row", and is widely considered to be the greatest baseball team in MLB history.

Regular season

The Yankees' 110 victories broke the previous American League mark of 105 (set by the 1912 Boston Red Sox) and would stand as the American League single-season record until it was broken by the Cleveland Indians in 1954. But counting their World Series sweep, the 1927 Yankees had a total record of 114–44 --- which is still the all-time highest single-season winning percentage (.721) in American League history. The 1998 Yankees, who also won their World Series in a sweep, are second with a full-season mark of 125-50 (.714).

This was the first year the Yankees acknowledged their team nickname on their uniforms, albeit their road uniforms. Their home uniforms remained free of any kind of logo except for the "NY" on their caps.

The roster included nine future Hall of Famers: Pitchers Herb Pennock and Waite Hoyt, Infielders Lou Gehrig and Tony Lazzeri, outfielders Babe Ruth and Earle Combs, Manager Miller Huggins, Team President Ed Barrow and Owner  Colonel Jacob Ruppert.

Babe Ruth
With the race long since decided, the nation's attention turned to Babe Ruth's pursuit of his own home run mark of 59, set in 1921. Early in the season, Ruth expressed doubts about his chances: "I don't suppose I'll ever break that 1921 record. To do that, you've got to start early, and the pitchers have got to pitch to you. I don't start early, and the pitchers haven't really pitched to me in four seasons. I get more bad balls to hit than any other five men...and fewer good ones." Ruth was also being challenged for his slugger's crown by teammate Lou Gehrig, who nudged ahead of Ruth's total in midseason, prompting the New York World-Telegram to anoint Gehrig the favorite. But Ruth caught Gehrig (who would finish with 47), and then had a remarkable last leg of the season, hitting 17 home runs in September. His 60th came on September 30, in the Yankees' next-to-last game against the Washington Senators at Yankee Stadium, where he hit a 2-run home run in the 8th inning off of Tom Zachary, where they won the game 4-2. Ruth was exultant, shouting after the game, "Sixty, count 'em, sixty! Let's see some other son of a bitch match that!" In later years, he would give Gehrig some credit: "Pitchers began pitching to me because if they passed me they still had Lou to contend with." In addition to his career-high 60 home runs, Ruth batted .356, drove in 164 runs and slugged .772.

Babe Ruth's 60 home runs

Season standings

Record vs. opponents

Roster

Player stats

Batting

Starters by position
Note: Pos = Position; G = Games played; AB = At bats; H = Hits; Avg. = Batting average; HR = Home runs; RBI = Runs batted in

Other batters
Note: G = Games played; AB = At bats; H = Hits; Avg. = Batting average; HR = Home runs; RBI = Runs batted in

Pitching

Starting pitchers
Note: G = Games pitched; IP = Innings pitched; W = Wins; L = Losses; ERA = Earned run average; SO = Strikeouts

Other pitchers
Note: G = Games pitched; IP = Innings pitched; W = Wins; L = Losses; ERA = Earned run average; SO = Strikeouts

Relief pitchers
Note: G = Games pitched; W = Wins; L = Losses; SV = Saves; ERA = Earned run average; SO = Strikeouts

1927 World Series

Awards and honors
 Lou Gehrig, AL MVP Award
Since a voter could select only one player per team, two good candidates from the same team could find their votes split and both of their chances of winning hurt. In addition, the clause prohibiting repeat winners led to unusual results like Babe Ruth's 1927 (one of the greatest offensive seasons of all time) not being eligible for the award. As The New York Times wrote in 1925, "[T]he purpose, of course, is to pass the honor around, but the effect is to pass an empty honor around."

League leaders
 Babe Ruth, Major League Baseball home run champion (60)
 Earle Combs, American League leader, triples (23)
 Lou Gehrig, American League RBI champion (175)

Franchise records
 Earle Combs, Yankees single season record, triples in a season (23)

In popular culture 

In 2016, ESPN announced 1927: The Diary of Myles Thomas, part of a new genre of storytelling known as "real-time historical fiction." The core of the project is a historical novel in the form of a diary of Myles Thomas, written by Douglas Alden, complemented by a wealth of fact-based content from the season, all published along the same timeline as the events unfolded almost 90 years ago.
Through Myles Thomas's diary entries, additional essays and real-time social-media components (including Twitter) "re-living" that famous Yankees season, the goal is to explore the rarefied nexus of baseball, jazz and Prohibition — defining elements of the remarkable world that existed in 1927. The diary runs the length of the full 1927 season, from April 13 through October 10, 1927.

Notes

References
 1927 New York Yankees at Baseball Reference
 1927 World Series
 1927 New York Yankees team page at www.baseball-almanac.com

New York Yankees seasons
New York Yankees
New York Yankees
1920s in the Bronx
American League champion seasons
World Series champion seasons